Driss Ahmed El-Asmar (born 4 December 1975) is a Moroccan former professional football goalkeeper who played for clubs in Morocco, Sweden and Greece. A full international between 1998 and 2003, he won three caps for Morocco and represented his country at the 1998 African Cup of Nations.

Club career
El-Asmar began playing club football with local side Difaa El Jadida in 1995. He moved to FAR Rabat for three seasons before returning to Difaa El Jadida for one more season before moving to play abroad.

El-Asmar initially went to Sweden to play for second division side Degerfors IF. After a successful season, he signed a three-year contract with Malmö FF in September 2001.

After his stint in Sweden, El-Asmar returned to Morocco to play for Raja Casablanca and would win the 2003–04 Botola title with the club. At age 30, he moved abroad again, signing with Ethnikos Asteras F.C. in the Greek second division in June 2006.

International career 
El-Asmar made three appearances for the Morocco national football team and was selected as a reserve goalkeeper for the 1998 African Cup of Nations finals. He had a good performance in a friendly during the 2004 Africa Cup of Nations qualifying build-up in April 2003.

References

External links

Profile at EPAE.org

1975 births
Living people
Moroccan footballers
Morocco international footballers
1998 African Cup of Nations players
Botola players
Allsvenskan players
Football League (Greece) players
Difaâ Hassani El Jadidi players
AS FAR (football) players
Degerfors IF players
Malmö FF players
Enköpings SK players
Raja CA players
Ethnikos Asteras F.C. players
Moroccan expatriate footballers
Moroccan expatriate sportspeople in Sweden
Moroccan expatriate sportspeople in Greece
Expatriate footballers in Sweden
Expatriate footballers in Greece
Association football goalkeepers